The Austria national under-18 rugby union team is the under-18 side of the Austria national rugby union team in the sport of rugby union.

History

Under-18 became a recognised age-grade in European rugby in 2004.

European Championship
Austria is a minor European rugby nation, its team having taken part in the D and C divisions of the European Under-18 Rugby Union Championship. In 2006, the team won the D division and earned promotion to the C division. It had only moderate success at this level, coming last on two occasions, in 2009 and 2011.

Honours
 European Under-18 Rugby Union Championship
 D- Division champions: 2006

European championship

Positions
The team's final positions in the European championship:

References

External links
 Österreichischer Rugby Verband - Official Site 

European national under-18 rugby union teams
Rugby union in Austria